222 (Live & Uncut) is the unedited version of comedian Patton Oswalt's first comedy album Feelin' Kinda Patton.  It was recorded at the 40 Watt Club in Athens, Georgia on September 27, 2003. The album has only one track on each of the two CDs. As of 2011, 222 is out of print but available digitally.

Track listing

Personnel
 Patton Oswalt – Performer
 Ron Baldwin – Producer
 Henry H. Owings – Producer
 Curt Wells – Recording Engineer

References

Patton Oswalt albums
2004 live albums